Sijangkang or the full name Kampung Sijangkang, is a place in Kuala Langat District, Selangor, Malaysia. The village is being administered by Zone 1 and 2 (west and east) of Kuala Langat Municipal Council.

Sijangkang is essentially a Javanese-Malay village and it is believed to have been founded about 1900. The name Sijangkang comes from a plant that similar to a rubber tree plant. It is a forest tree whose seeds are spread by explosion. Name of the tree is Jangkang. This tree may found in some parts of Indonesia.

Still related to the first opinion. The Jangkang trees die in a tributary river that was later given the name of Jangkang river. In Chinese, death is referred to as 'SI'. Thus arose the name Si Jangkang which eventually turned into Sijangkang.

References

External links
 Sekolah Kebangsaan Sijangkang
 Sijangkang Facebook

Kuala Langat District
Villages in Selangor